Steven Jay "Steve" Cohen (born August 29, 1955) is an American former Olympic judoka and Olympic coach. He won the US National Judo Championships in 1974, 1975, 1977, 1985, and 1987. He won a gold medal at the 1973 Maccabiah Games, a bronze medal at the 1975 Pan American Games, and a silver medal at the 1986 Goodwill Games.

Early and personal life
Cohen was born in Chicago, Illinois, and is Jewish. He taught judo at his own club, and became CEO of food ingredient company Z-Trim Holdings. He lives in Grayslake, Illinois. Cohen's brother Irwin Cohen and two nephews Aaron Cohen and Richard are all accomplished judoka.

Judo career
Cohen is a 7th-degree black belt.

He won a gold medal at the 1973 Maccabiah Games in Israel in judo, at 176 pounds.

He won the US National Judo Championships in 1974 (U93), 1975 (U80), 1977 (U78), 1985 (O95), and 1987 (O95).

Cohen won the bronze medal in the -80kg division at the 1975 Pan American Games.

In 1986 he won a silver medal at the Goodwill Games as a heavyweight. 

He came out of retirement and competed as a member of the 1988 Olympic Judo team for the United States as a heavyweight at 33 years of age, and came in 13th.  He competed in the 95kg division.

Coaching career
He was the coach of the Olympic team in 2000.

He now coaches judo.  Among his students have been five-time US champion Aaron Cohen, three-time Olympian and Pam American Games bronze medalist  Colleen Rosensteel, two-time Olympian and Pan American Games bronze medalist Martin Boonzaayer, junior world champion and two-time Olympian Hillary Wolf, and Olympic silver medalist Robert Berland.

References

External links
 

1955 births
Living people
American male judoka
American Olympic coaches
Competitors at the 1973 Maccabiah Games
Jewish martial artists
Jewish American sportspeople
Maccabiah Games medalists in judo
Maccabiah Games gold medalists for the United States
Olympic judoka of the United States
Judoka at the 1988 Summer Olympics
Pan American Games bronze medalists for the United States
Pan American Games medalists in judo
Goodwill Games medalists in judo
Judoka at the 1975 Pan American Games
Competitors at the 1986 Goodwill Games
Medalists at the 1975 Pan American Games